Halo- is a Greek prefix meaning "salt." In biology, it is often used to indicate halotolerance and is a portion of many words:
Halobacteria
Haloclasty
Halophile
Halophyte

See also 
Halo (disambiguation)